In mathematics, especially in category theory, a closed monoidal category (or a monoidal closed category) is a category that is both a monoidal category and a closed category in such a way that the structures are compatible.

A non-cartesian example is the category of vector spaces, K-Vect,  over a field . Here the monoidal product is the usual tensor product of vector spaces, and the internal Hom is the vector space of linear maps from one vector space to another.

The internal language of closed symmetric monoidal categories is linear logic and the type system is the linear type system.  Many examples of closed monoidal categories are symmetric. However, this need not always be the case, as non-symmetric monoidal categories can be encountered in category-theoretic formulations of linguistics; roughly speaking, this is because word-order in natural language matters.

Definition
A closed monoidal category is a monoidal category  such that for every object  the functor  given by right tensoring with 
 
has a right adjoint, written 
 
This means that there exists a bijection, called 'currying', between the Hom-sets

that is natural in both A and C.  In a different, but common notation, one would say that the functor 

has a right adjoint

Equivalently, a closed monoidal category  is a category equipped, for every two objects A and B, with
 an object ,
 a morphism ,
satisfying the following universal property: for every morphism

there exists a unique morphism

such that

It can be shown that this construction defines a functor . Many other notations are in common use for the internal Hom.

Biclosed and symmetric categories
Strictly speaking, we have defined a right closed monoidal category, since we required that right tensoring with any object  has a right adjoint.   In a left closed monoidal category, we instead demand that the functor of left tensoring with any object 
 
have a right adjoint 

A biclosed monoidal category is a monoidal category that is both left and right closed.

A symmetric monoidal category  is left closed if and only if it is right closed. Thus we may safely speak of a 'symmetric monoidal closed category' without  specifying whether it is left or right closed.

We have described closed monoidal categories as monoidal categories with an extra property.  One can equivalently define a closed monoidal category to be a closed category with an extra property.  Namely, we can demand the existence of a tensor product that is left adjoint to the internal Hom functor.
In this approach, closed monoidal categories are also called monoidal closed categories.

Examples

 Every cartesian closed category is a symmetric, monoidal closed category, when the monoidal structure is the cartesian product structure.  The internal Hom functor is given by the exponential object .
 In particular, the category of sets, Set, is a symmetric, closed monoidal category.
 The category of modules, R-Mod over a commutative ring R is a non-cartesian, symmetric, monoidal closed category. The monoidal product is given by the tensor product of modules and the internal Hom  is given by the space of R-linear maps  with its natural R-module structure.
 In particular, the category of vector spaces over a field  is a symmetric, closed monoidal category.
 Abelian groups can be regarded as Z-modules, so the category of abelian groups is also a symmetric, closed monoidal category.
The canonical example is the category of finite-dimensional vector spaces, FdVect.

Counterexamples

 The category of rings is a symmetric, monoidal category under the tensor product of rings, with  serving as the unit object. This category is not closed. If it were, there would be exactly one homomorphism between any pair of rings: . The same holds for the category of R-algebras over a commutative ring R.

See also
Isbell conjugacy

References

Monoidal categories
Closed categories